The 2007 K League was the 25th season of the K League. The format of the league was changed from two stages to single league since this season. Each team played 26 matches against every other teams under the home and away system. After the regular league was finished, the top six clubs qualified for the championship playoffs to determine champions.

It took a break after the Round 13 on 23 June due to the 2007 AFC Asian Cup, and resumed with the Round 14 on 8 August.

Regular season

League table
The top six teams qualified for the championship playoffs.

Results

Championship playoffs

Bracket

Final table

Top scorers
This list includes goals of the championship playoffs. The official top goalscorer was decided with records of only regular season, and Cabore won the award with 17 goals.

Awards

Main awards
The K League Players' Player of the Year was published by Korean edition of FourFourTwo in summer, and was not an official award of the K League, but 100 players participated in the selection process.

Best XI

Source:

Attendance
At the end of the 2007 season, the K League attracted 2,073,808 fans and an average of 11,786 fans per game. That puts the K League at 15th in the world for average attendances for domestic premier leagues for association football.

See also
 2007 in South Korean football
 2007 K League Championship
 2007 Korean League Cup
 2007 Korean FA Cup

References

External links

K League seasons
1
South Korea
South Korea